Msinsi Community Conservancy is an  sandstone sourveld grasslands reserve in Kloof, Durban, KwaZulu-Natal, South Africa.  The park is managed by the Kloof Conservancy, a community organisation that promotes conservation of natural heritage.

Flora and Fauna 
The rare foxglove orchid is found in the grassland, while in the forest section two endangered frog species occur: the Kloof frog and the Natal leaf-folding frog.

References 

Nature reserves in South Africa
Protected areas of KwaZulu-Natal